The 1944 Copa de Competencia Británica Final was the final that decided the winner of the 1st. edition of this Argentine domestic cup. It was played on December 9, 1944. Huracán defeated Boca Juniors 4–2 at San Lorenzo Stadium, winning their first Copa Británica trophy.

Qualified teams

Overview 
The cup was contested by the same clubs participating in 1944 Argentine Primera División, playing a single-elimination format in a neutral venue. Huracán beat Vélez Sarsfield 2–1, arch-rival San Lorenzo 4–3, and Newell's Old Boys 4–1 in semifinals.

On the other hand, Boca Juniors beat Racing 3–2, Banfield 4–2, and Platense 1–0 in semifinal.

In the final, Huracán beat Boca Juniors 4–2. Boca Juniors players Natalio Pescia and Mario Boyé were sent off.

Match details

References

b
b
1944 in Argentine football
Football in Buenos Aires